Sasha Montenegro (born Aleksandra Aćimović Popović (Cyrillic: Александра Аћимовић Поповић; 20 January 1946) is a Mexican actress of Montenegrin descent.

She was married to the late José López Portillo, a former President of Mexico.

Early life and career 
Sasha Montenegro was born in Bari, Kingdom of Italy as the only child of Montenegrin parents Silvia Popović and Živojin Aćimović. Her mother belonged to an aristocratic family from Montenegro and her father worked for the British Intelligence Service. Members of Silvia Popović's family reportedly died in death camps during the Nazi occupation of Yugoslavia.

Her remaining family moved to Argentina where she was raised. She then relocated to Mexico. Sasha became an actress in the 1970s and made several lucha libre movies with superstar El Santo. Starting in the mid-1970s and through towards the late 1980s, she obtained roles in several Mexican sex comedies. She participated in four telenovelas and had a starring role in Una mujer marcada ("A tainted woman", 1979).

Personal life 

In the 1980s, she maintained a relationship with the former President of Mexico, José López Portillo, who was still married to Carmen Romano, with whom he had three children. López Portillo obtained a divorce from Romano. He and Montenegro married in 2000 after Romano's death.

Montenegro battled with López Portillo during his later years. When he was hospitalized with pneumonia in 2004, her visits with him were limited by his children from the previous marriage. During this time and amidst divorce proceedings with Montenegro, López Portillo died.

Montenegro has two children,  Nabila (born 1985) and Alejandro (born 1990).

Awards and nominations

Filmography

Telenovelas

Films 

 The End of Silence (2005) as El Convento Rica Dancer 
 El secuestro de un policía (1991)
 La fuerza del odio (1990)
 La taquera picante (1990) as Ana Dalia
 Ellos trajeron la violencia (1990) as Nora
 Dos tipas de cuidado (1989)
 Rumbera, caliente (1989)
 Sólo para adúlteros (1989)
 El pájaro con suelas (1989)
 Las guerreras del amor (1989)
 Los rateros (1989)
 Los plomeros y las ficheras (1988)
 Dos machos que ladran no muerden (1988)
 Ladrón (1988)
 Solicito marido para engañar (1988) as Virginia
 El Diablo, el santo y el tonto (1987)
 Las traigo muertas (1987)
 Ases del contrabando (1987)
 Niños sobre pedido (1987)
 Noche de Califas (1987)
 Huele a gas (1986)
 Mientras México duerme (1986)
 El hijo de Pedro Navaja (1986) as La Tijuana
 El secuestro de Camarena (1985)
 La risa alarga la vida y algo más (1985)
 Playa prohibida (1985) as Elena
 Entre ficheras anda el diablo - La pulquería 3 (1984)
 Extraño matrimonio (1984)
 Piernas cruzadas (1984)
 El puente (1984)
 Las glorias del gran Púas (1984)
 Pedro Navaja (1984) as La Tijuana
 El tonto que hacía milagros (1984)
 Fieras en brama (1983)
 Se me sale cuando me río (1983)
 La golfa del barrio (1983)
 Las modelos de desnudos (1983)
 Las vedettes (1983)
 Chile picante (1983)
 Con el cuerpo prestado (1983) as Marta Jiménez de Arias Salgado
 Huevos rancheros (1982)
 La pulquería 2 (1982) as Norma and La Gemela
 Llámenme Mike (1982) as Zoila
 The Pulque Tavern (1981) as Norma
 D.F./Distrito Federal (1981)
 Las tentadoras (1980) as Luz Maria/Lucía
 Blanca Nieves y... sus 7 amantes (1980)
 El sexo me da risa (1979)
 La vida difícil de una mujer fácil (1979)
 The Loving Ones (1979) as Carolina
 Midnight Dolls (1979) as Gina
 Carnival Nights (1978)
 El hijo es mío (1978)
 Los japoneses no esperan (1978)
 Oye Salomé! (1978) as Bettina
 Bellas de noche 2 (1977) as Carmen
 Acapulco 12-22 (1975)
 Bellas de noche (1975) as Carmen
 Noche de muerte (1975)
 Pistoleros de la muerte (1975)
 Un amor extraño (1975)
 Santo en Anónimo mortal (1975) as Ester
 Peregrina (1974) as Alma Reed
 Pistoleros bajo el sol (1974)
 Fe, esperanza y caridad (1974) as Ecuyére
 Santo y Blue Demon contra el doctor Frankenstein (1974) as Alicia Robles
 Los vampiros de Coyoacán (1974)
 Duelo al atardecer (1973)
 Las bestias del terror (1973)
 Santo contra la magia negra (1973) as Bellamira
 Santo contra los asesinos de otros mundos (1973) as Karen Bernstein
 El hombre y la bestia (1973)
 Hijazo de mi vidaza (1972)
 Un sueño de amor (1972)

References

External links 

Una mujer marcada at the Telenovela database
Sasha Montenegro, de nuevo en juzgados  ("Sasha Montenegro, again in court"), article on esmas.com

1946 births
Living people
People from Bari
Mexican film actresses
Mexican vedettes
Mexican telenovela actresses
Mexican people of Montenegrin descent
Italian people of Montenegrin descent
Italian emigrants to Mexico
Italian emigrants to Argentina
Naturalized citizens of Mexico
Montenegrin actresses
20th-century Mexican actresses
21st-century Mexican actresses